Leucangium carthusianum is a species of ascomycete fungus. It is commonly known as the Oregon black truffle. It is found in the Pacific Northwest region of North America, where it grows in an ectomycorrhizal association with Douglas-fir. It is commercially collected, usually assisted by a specially trained truffle dog. Mature fruiting bodies can be dug up mostly during winter, but the season can extend from September through April.

Description
On the outside, the fruit bodies are dark brown and rough to smooth. They are sometimes mistaken for coal lumps. Inside, the gleba is gray to brownish and separated into pockets by veins. The odor is pungent and fruity, usually resembling pineapple.

Edibility
Leucangium carthusianum is a good edible mushroom; it can be prepared similarly to Oregon White and European truffles; it is typically shaved raw on top of a dish to add its complex musky aroma.

See also

 Tuber oregonense

References

External links

 Mushroaming.com: Truffles in the Pacific Northwest

Edible fungi
Fungi described in 1862
Fungi of North America
Morchellaceae